Claude Rodman Porter (July 8, 1872 – August 17, 1946) was an American politician. He served on the Iowa General Assembly, served as a United States Attorney, and was perennial Democratic runner-up to Republican victors in three races for Iowa governor and six races for U.S. senator. In an era in which Republicans in Iowa won so often that Senator Jonathan P. Dolliver remarked that "Iowa will go Democratic when Hell goes Methodist," Porter twice came closer to winning the governorship than all but one other Democratic candidate of that era. He later served as a member of the U.S. Interstate Commerce Commission for eighteen years.

Background
Porter was born to attorney George D. Porter and Hannah (Rodman) Porter in the city of Moulton, Iowa in Appanoose County. He was educated at Parsons College in Fairfield, Iowa and St. Louis Law School (now known as Washington University in St. Louis School of Law).

Service in the legislature and military
After becoming admitted to the bar in 1893 and beginning to serve as a lawyer in Centerville, Iowa, he was elected in 1895, at age twenty-three, to the Iowa House of Representatives as a "fusion candidate" with Democratic Party and Populist Party support. The youngest member of the House, Porter served two terms (from 1896 to 1900).

In 1898, while a state representative, he served in the U.S. Army with the 51st Iowa Volunteers during the Spanish–American War and early stages of the Philippine–American War. While in the service, he also ran unsuccessfully for the Democratic nomination for the U.S. House in Iowa's 8th congressional district, and for Iowa Secretary of State. In 1899 he married Maude Boutin, and was elected to the Iowa State Senate from the 3rd District, where he served from 1900 to 1904. In 1900, 1902, 1904, and 1906, he refused requests to run again for Congress in the 8th district, concluding each time that incumbent Republican Congressman William P. Hepburn could not be defeated.

Statewide elections 1906–1911
In 1906, Porter ran for Governor of Iowa, winning the Democratic nomination, but losing to incumbent Republican Albert B. Cummins.

Because the term of U.S. Senator Dolliver would expire in March 1907, Dolliver was up for re-election by the General Assembly in January 1907. All but one of the Democrats in the General Assembly voted for Porter rather than Dolliver, but their numbers were far too few to prevent Dolliver's re-election.

In 1908, Iowa's other U.S. Senate seat was up, and a new state law provided for Senate nominees to be selected in a primary election. Porter won the Democratic nomination. Senator William B. Allison defeated Cummins in the Republican primary but died soon thereafter, and in a special convention Republicans chose Cummins to take Allison's place as Republican nominee. The Iowa General Assembly, which retained the power to choose U.S. senators from among the parties' nominees, twice selected Cummins over Porter, in a November 1908 vote (resolving who would serve the rest of Allison's original March 1903 – 1909 term) and a January 1909 vote (resolving who would serve the March 1909 – 1915 term).

In 1910 Porter ran for governor again, this time losing to incumbent Republican Beryl F. Carroll.

Porter tried again to become a U.S. Senator in 1911, when the entire contest was decided in the Iowa General Assembly without a primary due in part to Dolliver's death. Porter was the choice of the Democrats' minority caucus, and the Republicans' majority caucus divided their votes among multiple candidates, but at the end of the legislative session, on the 67th ballot, Republican William S. Kenyon finally achieved a large enough majority to win. In all, five times in five years, Porter was the Democrats' top choice for either Governor or U.S. Senator, but came away with nothing.

Wartime prosecutor and candidate for governor
After Democrat Woodrow Wilson was elected president, Porter was nominated and confirmed as U.S. Attorney for the Southern District of Iowa, where he served from 1914 to 1918. While serving as U.S. Attorney, he aggressively enforced the Espionage Act of 1917 against persons who spoke out against the draft or "assisted" others who did so, including the defendants in the 1917–18 Davenport sedition trial.  He also served as first assistant special prosecutor in the Chicago trial of over one hundred members of the Industrial Workers of the World on similar charges. After a trial that lasted from April to August 1918, the jury deliberated briefly and returned convictions of all 100 remaining defendants, including IWW general secretary Big Bill Haywood. Soon after the trial was completed, Porter was promoted to Assistant Attorney General of the United States.

Porter continued to prosecute federal charges while running for Iowa governor in 1918.  He received the Democratic nomination without opposition, and faced incumbent Republican William L. Harding in the general election. Despite Porter's attacks on Harding's patriotism, Harding prevailed, as part of an Iowa Republican sweep.

Porter continued to serve as an Assistant U.S. Attorney General until July 1919, when he became chief counsel for the Federal Trade Commission, serving in that position until October 1, 1920.

Statewide elections 1920–1926
In November 1920, Porter again ran unsuccessfully for the U.S. Senate. Once again, he was the Democratic nominee against Cummins, who had served as a senator since defeating Porter in 1908.

Porter's chances for a victory in a statewide election were the greatest in 1926, when he again ran for the U.S. Senate, this time against insurgent Republican Smith W. Brookhart. Brookhart was fiercely opposed by many within his own party because of his anti-business, pro-labor views, and Brookhart's opposition to Republican President Calvin Coolidge, and had officially lost the 1924 race for Iowa's other Senate seat to Democrat Daniel Steck. However, Porter again lost in the general election. Porter never again ran for statewide office.

Porter also served as a delegate from Iowa to Democratic National Conventions in 1908, 1912, and 1924. He also served on the Iowa State Board of Education from 1925 until November 1928.

Interstate Commerce Commission
In 1928, he was appointed by President Coolidge to the Interstate Commerce Commission in Washington, D.C. He served as a member of the Commission until his death on August 17, 1946, of a cerebral hemorrhage. He died the same day that his son, George B. Porter, was buried, following his accidental death five days earlier.

References

External links

 The Political Graveyard: Politicians: Porter, C to D, (accessed 2009-02-21).

1872 births
Iowa lawyers
People from Moulton, Iowa
School board members in Iowa
Democratic Party members of the Iowa House of Representatives
Democratic Party Iowa state senators
United States Attorneys for the Southern District of Iowa
People of the Interstate Commerce Commission
1946 deaths
Parsons College alumni
Washington University School of Law alumni
American military personnel of the Spanish–American War
American military personnel of the Philippine–American War
United States Army soldiers
United States Assistant Attorneys General
Federal Trade Commission personnel